Trip na Trip was a Philippine travel show broadcast by ABS-CBN. Produced by Bayan Productions in cooperation with ABS-CBN News and Current Affairs, it aired from February 5, 2006 to July 22, 2011 and was initially hosted by Katherine de Castro and Franzen Fajardo. A one-of-a-kind reality-based travel show on Philippine television, the program focused on lesser-known and even unexplored regions of the country and attracted both local and foreign viewers. The program's last co-hosts, De Castro, Fajardo, Kian Kazemi, Uma Khouny, Jason Gainza, Boogs Bugia, Akihiro Sato, and Kevin Lapena, collectively known as the Trippers and dubbed as the new faces of Philippine tourism, hosted it until it was canceled due to Bayan Productions' financial restrictions.

Segments
 Hamon ng Bayan
 Usapang Berde
 Food Trip
 Cooking Ko, Cooking Mo, Cooking Nating Lahat

Awards
 2011 PMPC Star Awards for Television's "Best Travel Show"
 2011 PMPC Star Awards for Television's "Best Travel Show Host/s" (Kat de Castro, Jason Gainza, Franzen Fajardo, and Kian Kazemi)

References

ABS-CBN original programming
ABS-CBN News and Current Affairs shows
Philippine travel television series
2006 Philippine television series debuts
2011 Philippine television series endings
Filipino-language television shows
Television series by Bayan Productions